Cinema Prague are an Australian funk metal band, formed in Perth in 1986.

Cinema Prague are a band whose combination of humour, funk, thrash and Zappa-esque arrangements made them one of the most entertaining and musically dexterous bands to ever come from Perth. Although the band never reached the international fame of some of their contemporaries, such as Jebediah or Beaverloop, they remain one of the more revered bands in Western Australian musical history and are regularly cited by younger bands as an influence.

Biography
Initially formed as a four piece in 1986, when some of the members were still at high school, the band had little success to start with. Kailis went to South Perth Primary School, whilst Lowe and Horan went to Attadale Primary School. Horan went on to Perth Modern School participating in their music programme, whilst Lowe and Kailis attended Applecross Senior High School.

By early 1988, after some member and name shuffling, the three-piece band, Cinema Prague came into existence. In 1990 the band undertook their first tour of the eastern states of Australia.  Their debut recording was a cassette-single with the songs "Mushroom Cloud" and "Walking Song", released in November 1991. It was followed much later by their debut album, Meldatype, which was recorded between 1992 and 1994 and released in March 1995. The band's next release was a five track EP, ¡Zasph! which was released in November 1996. Cinema Prague's third album, Nordensort, was released in May 1998 although it was actually recorded in June/July 1995.

In 1997, after returning from Perth following their 'Idiots Crusade' tour of Europe and South Africa they recorded three tracks "We are the Moo Moo", "The Curse of the Shiny Head" and "Bacon and Eggs Part Two" at Poons Head Studio. The band's fourth album It's Schnapster, although recorded in 1990, was released in December 1998 whilst the band was in hiatus. Horan having headed to Britain, where he still performs as well as runs musical workshops for under-age offenders in prisons.

Kailis and Lowe played together in various projects, including Rice. They also undertook further studies, with Lowe studying engineering and Kailis studying architecture.

In 2007 they re-formed for a show with a new bassist Roy Martinez (Dave Mann Collective) and a plan was hatched to release the old recordings as part of a new album, Snakes Alive, the band's first in over eight years.

Snakes Alive was released on 30 January 2009. In an interview at the time, Kailis indicated that the band was planning to work on the new album.  In support of the album's release the band gave a number of performances in Perth and Melbourne in early 2009.

As of May 2019 Cinema Prague's discography is now available on Bandcamp. In July 2019 the band reformed for a sold-out show at Fremantle Town Hall as part of the Fremantle Festival.

Members
 Rex Horan – bass, vocals (1988–1998, 2019)
 George Kailis – guitar, vocals (1988–1998, 2007, 2009–present)
 Tim Lowe – drums (1988–1998, 2007, 2009–present)
 Roy Martinez – bass (2007 - 2009)

Discography

Albums/EPs
 Meldatype – Seeing Ear Records (March 1995)
 ¡Zasph! – Seeing Ear Records (November 1996)
 Nordensost (May 1998)
 It's Schnapster (December 1998)
 Snakes Alive (30 January 2009)

Singles
 "Mushroom Cloud" / "Walking Song" – Proton (November 1991) (cassette single)

References

External links
 Cinema Prague official website
 Cinema Prague Myspace page
 Cinema Prague @ MusicBrainz

Musical groups established in 1986
Western Australian musical groups
Musical groups disestablished in 2009
1986 establishments in Australia
Funk metal musical groups